Robot-sumo, or pepe-sumo, is a sport in which two robots attempt to push each other out of a circle (in a similar fashion to the sport of sumo). The robots used in this competition are called sumobots.

The engineering challenges are for the robot to find its opponent (usually accomplished with infrared or ultra-sonic sensors) and to push it out of the flat arena. A robot should also avoid leaving the arena, usually by means of a sensor that detects the edge.

The most common "weapon" used in a sumobot competition is an angled blade at the front of the robot, usually tilted at about a 45-degree angle towards the back of the robot. This blade has an adjustable height for different tactics.

Robot-sumo is divided into classes, fought on progressively smaller arenas:
 Heavy-weight. Standard in the National Robotics Challenge. Robots may weigh up to 125 pounds (56.8 kg) and fit in a 2-foot cube (61 cm).
 Light-weight. Also standard in the National Robotics Challenge. Robots may weigh up to 50 pounds (22.7 kg) and fit in a 2-foot cube (61 cm).
 Standard class (sometimes named Mega-sumo) robots may mass up to 3 kg and fit inside a 20 cm by 20 cm box, any height.
 Mini-sumo. Up to 500 g mass, 10 cm by 10 cm, any height.
 Micro-sumo. Up to 100 g mass, must fit in a 5 cm cube.
 Nano-sumo. Must fit in a 2.5 cm cube.
There is also Lego Mindstorms NXT sumo robots, in which NXT robots compete. The robots usually have to fit in a one-foot cube.

Classes are further divided into remote-controlled and autonomous robots. Also, there might be a tethered category (varies)

Sumo robots are built from scratch, from kits or from Lego components, particularly the Lego Mindstorms sets.

References

External links

FSI-All Japan Robot-Sumo Tournament
JSumo - Unofficial Sumo Robot Web Site
MiniSumo wiki A new wiki aimed at the mini class of sumo, the site also host a related forum for builders.
RobotRoom
Robot Tutorials for Beginners
Official French Rules
Full and detailed presentation of a robot sumo by students of Baronnerie,Angers (France).
Autonomous robots, maze solvers, mini sumo forum
Sumo Robot Parts Tutorial

Competitions
RoboChallenge Biggest robotics competition held in Bucharest, Romania
RoboCore WinterChallenge Biggest robotics competition held in Brazil
Competencia Robotica Biggest robotics competition held in Valparaiso, Chile.
BattleLab Robotica Annual competition in Cluj-Napoca, Romania
International RoboGames Annual competition with global sumo contestants
Istrobot Annual robotic competition in Bratislava held Mini-Sumo category until 2011
Milford Autonomous Robotics Competition Annual competition near Cincinnati, OH 
Robofest RoboSumo Competition
RobotChallenge Annual robotic competition in Vienna with Standard-, Mini-, Micro-, Nano-, Lego- and Humanoid-Sumo
Official French Tournament
Robot sumo Angers Annual French robotic competition in Angers
Southern Illinois University Edwardsville's Robot-Sumo Competition
BalticRobotSumo Annual Standard-Sumo, Mini-sumo and Roomba-Sumo robotic competition in Latvia, Lithuania and Estonia. Instead it is lately held annual together with Estonian Robotex and later will be Joined with other Baltic international level national annual competitions Latvijas Robotikas Čempionāts and Lithuanian Robotiada
Robot-SM The Swedish Robotics Championship with Standard- and mini-sumo.
SumoRobotLeague Annual North American Sumo Robot tournament with smaller regional tournaments.
Baronas 2017 National Robotics Competition in Indonesia, Sumo Category 2017
Robotic Arena Annual robotic international competition held in Poland including Mega-, Mini- and Nano-Sumo, among other competitions.
Roboton.io Online virtual robot competitions.

Robot combat
Sumo